Conrail , formally the Consolidated Rail Corporation, was the primary Class I railroad in the Northeastern United States between 1976 and 1999. The trade name Conrail is a portmanteau based on the company's legal name. It continues to do business as an asset management and network services provider in three Shared Assets Areas that were excluded from the division of its operations during its acquisition by CSX Corporation and the Norfolk Southern Railway.

The federal government created Conrail to take over the potentially-profitable lines of multiple bankrupt carriers, including the Penn Central Transportation Company and Erie Lackawanna Railway. After railroad regulations were lifted by the 4R Act and the Staggers Act, Conrail began to turn a profit in the 1980s and was privatized in 1987. The two remaining Class I railroads in the East, CSX Transportation and the Norfolk Southern Railway (NS), agreed in 1997 to acquire the system and split it into two roughly-equal parts (alongside three residual shared-assets areas), returning rail freight competition to the Northeast by essentially undoing the 1968 merger of the Pennsylvania Railroad and New York Central Railroad that created Penn Central. Following approval by the Surface Transportation Board, CSX and NS took control in August 1998, and on June 1, 1999, began operating their respective portions of Conrail.

The old company remains a jointly-owned subsidiary, with CSX and NS owning respectively 42% and 58% of its stock, corresponding to how much of Conrail's assets they acquired. Each parent, however, has an equal voting interest. The primary asset retained by Conrail is ownership of the three Shared Assets Areas in New Jersey, Philadelphia, and Detroit. Both CSX and NS have the right to serve all shippers in these areas, paying Conrail for the cost of maintaining and improving trackage. They also make use of Conrail to perform switching and terminal services within the areas, but not as a common carrier, since contracts are signed between shippers and CSX or NS. Conrail also retains various support facilities including maintenance-of-way and training, as well as a 51 percent share in the Indiana Harbor Belt Railroad.

History

Context: 1973–1976 
In the years leading to 1973, the freight railroad system of the United States was collapsing. Although government-funded Amtrak took over intercity passenger services on May 1, 1971, railroad companies continued to lose money due to extensive government regulations, expensive labor costs, competition from other transportation modes, declining industrial business and other factors.

Its largest Eastern railroad, the Penn Central Railroad (PC), had declared bankruptcy in 1970, after less than three years of existence. Formed in 1968 by the merger of the New York Central Railroad and Pennsylvania Railroad (and supplemented in 1969 by the New York, New Haven and Hartford Railroad), the PC was created with almost no plans to merge the varied corporate cultures, and the resulting company was a hopelessly-entangled mess. At its lowest point, PC was losing over $1 million a day and trains were becoming lost all over the railroad.

In 1972, Hurricane Agnes damaged the rundown Northeast railway network and threatened the solvency of other railroads, including the somewhat more solvent Erie Lackawanna (EL). In mid-1973, officials with the bankrupt Penn Central threatened to liquidate and cease operations by year's end if they did not receive government aid by October 1. This threat to US freight and passenger traffic galvanized the Congress to quickly create a bill to nationalize the bankrupt railroads. The Association of American Railroads, which opposed nationalization, submitted an alternate proposal for a government-funded private company. Judge Fullam forced the Penn Central to operate into 1974, when, on January 2, after threatening a veto, President Richard Nixon signed the Regional Rail Reorganization Act of 1973 into law. The "3R Act," as it was called, provided interim funding to the bankrupt railroads and defined a new Consolidated Rail Corporation under the Association of American Railroads' plan.

The 3R Act also formed the United States Railway Association (USRA), another government corporation, taking over the powers of the Interstate Commerce Commission with respect to allowing the bankrupt railroads to abandon unprofitable lines. The USRA was incorporated on February 1, 1974, and Edward G. Jordan, an insurance executive from California, was named president on March 18 by Nixon. Arthur D. Lewis of Eastern Air Lines was appointed chairman on April 30, and the remainder of the board was named on May 30 and sworn in on July 11.

Under the 3R Act, the USRA was to create a "Final System Plan" to decide which lines should be included in the new Consolidated Rail Corporation. Unlike most railroad consolidations, only the designated lines were to be taken over. Other lines would be sold to Amtrak, various state governments, transportation agencies, and solvent railroads. The few remaining lines were to remain with the old companies along with all previously-abandoned lines, many stations, and all non-rail related properties, thus converting most of the old companies into solvent property-holding companies. The plan was unveiled on July 26, 1975, consisting of lines from Penn Central and six other companies—the Ann Arbor Railroad (bankrupt 1973), Erie Lackawanna Railway (1972), Lehigh Valley Railroad (1970), Reading Company (1971), Central Railroad of New Jersey (1967) and Lehigh and Hudson River Railway (1972). Controlled railroads and jointly-owned railroads such as Pennsylvania-Reading Seashore Lines and the Raritan River Railroad (1980) were also included (See list of railroads transferred to Conrail for a full list). It was approved by Congress on November 9, and on February 5, 1976, President Gerald Ford signed the Railroad Revitalization and Regulatory Reform Act of 1976, which included this Final System Plan, into law.

The EL had been formed in 1960 as a merger of the Erie Railroad and Delaware, Lackawanna and Western Railroad. It too was bankrupt, but was somewhat stronger financially than the others. It was ruled reorganizable under Chapter 77 on April 30, 1974 (as had the Boston and Maine Railroad), but on January 9, 1975, with no end to its losses in sight, its trustees reconsidered and asked for inclusion. The Final System Plan assigned a major section of the EL, from northern New Jersey west to northeast Ohio, to be sold to the Chessie System, which would help spur competition in Conrail's territory. Chessie, however, could not reach an agreement with EL labor unions, and in February 1976 announced that it would not be buying the EL section. The USRA hurriedly assigned large amounts of trackage rights to the Delaware and Hudson Railway, allowing it to compete in the Philadelphia, Pennsylvania, and Washington, D.C., markets.
The State of Michigan decided to keep operational the full Ann Arbor Railroad, of which Conrail would run only the southernmost portion. Michigan bought it and the whole line was operated by Conrail for several years until it was sold to a short line.

Operation: 1976–1986 
Conrail was incorporated in Pennsylvania on October 25, 1974, and operations began on April 1, 1976. The government owned 85%,  with employees owning the remaining 15%. The theory was that if the service was improved through increased capital investment, the economic basis of the railroad would be improved. During its first seven years, Conrail proved to be highly unprofitable, despite receiving billions of dollars of assistance from Congress. The corporation declared enormous losses on its federal income tax returns from 1976 through 1982, resulting in an accumulated net operating loss of $2.2 billion during that period. Congress once again reacted with support by passing the Northeast Rail Service Act of 1981 (NERSA), which amended portions of the 3R Act by exempting Conrail from liability for any state taxes and requiring the Secretary of Transportation to make arrangements for the sale of the government's interest in Conrail. After NERSA was implemented, Conrail, under the aggressive leadership of L. Stanley Crane began to improve and reported taxable income between $2 million and $314 million each year from 1983 through 1986.

Conrail's government-funded rebuilding of the dilapidated infrastructure and rolling stock it inherited from its six predecessors succeeded by the end of the 1970s in improving the physical condition of tracks, locomotives and freight cars. However, fundamental economic regulatory issues remained, and Conrail continued to post losses of as much as $1 million a day. Conrail management, recognizing the need for more regulatory freedoms to address the economic issues, were among the parties lobbying for what became the Staggers Act of 1980, which significantly loosened the Interstate Commerce Commission's rigid economic control of the rail industry. This allowed Conrail and other carriers the opportunity to become profitable and strengthen their finances.

The Staggers Act allowed the setting of rates that would recover capital and operating cost (fully allocated cost recovery) by each and every route mile the railroad operated. There would be no more cross-subsidization of costs between route-miles (that is, revenue on profitable route segments were not used to subsidize routes where rates were set at intermodal parity, yet still did recover fully-allocated costs). Finally, where current and/or future traffic projections showed that profitable volumes of traffic would not return, the railroads were allowed to abandon those routes, shippers and passengers to other modes of transportation. Under the Staggers Act, railroads, including Conrail, were freed from the requirement to continue money-losing services.

Conrail began turning a profit by 1981, the result of the Staggers Act freedoms and its own managerial improvements under the leadership of L. Stanley Crane, who had been chief executive officer of the Southern Railway. While the Staggers Act helped immensely in allowing all railroads to more-easily abandon unprofitable rail lines and set their own freight rates, it was under Crane's leadership that Conrail truly became a profitable operation. Soon after Crane took office in 1981 he shed another 4,400 miles from the Conrail system in the following two years, which accounted for only 1% of the railroad's overall traffic and 2% of its profits while saving it millions of dollars in maintenance costs. NERSA relieved Conrail of its requirement to provide commuter service on the Northeast Corridor, further improving its finances.

In 1984, the government put its 85% share up for sale. Bids were received from Alleghany Corporation, Citibank, an employee buyout, Guilford Transportation Industries, Norfolk Southern Railway and a consortium headed by J. Willard Marriott. On February 8, 1985, Secretary of Transportation Elizabeth Dole announced Norfolk Southern Railway as the successful bidder.

After considerable debate in Congress, the Conrail Privatization Act of 1986 was signed into law by President Reagan on October 21, 1986. However, in August 1986, Norfolk Southern had withdrawn its bid citing Congressional delays and taxation changes. The government decided that its interest in Conrail would then be sold by the then-largest initial public offering in US history. The sale was effective from March 26, 1987, when Conrail's stock, worth $1.65 billion, was sold to private investors.

Passenger rail operations 
Conrail inherited the commuter rail operations of its predecessor lines. It relinquished several during the 1970s, including the Erie Cleveland–Youngstown service (discontinued in 1977), the Pennsylvania Railroad Chicago–Valparaiso service (transferred to Amtrak in 1979), and the services within the Massachusetts Bay Transportation Authority service district (transferred to the Boston and Maine Railroad, under contract to the MBTA, in March 1977). Pursuant to the Northeast Rail Service Act of 1981, Conrail operated the remainder until 1983 when these services were transferred to state or metropolitan transit authorities. The transit authorities purchased the track and right-of-way on which their commuter operations ran, leaving Conrail freight operations as a tenant.

Breakup 1997–1999 
With Conrail's increasing success, it decided to merge the company with another railroad, so it approached CSX Transportation about buying Conrail. CSX's bid for Conrail, however, drew the attention of Norfolk Southern Railway which,  fearing that CSX would come to dominate rail traffic in the eastern US, made a bid of its own leading to a takeover battle between the two railroads. In 1997, however, the two railroads struck a compromise agreement to jointly acquire Conrail and split most of its assets between them, with Norfolk Southern acquiring a larger portion of the Conrail network via a larger stock buyout. Under the final agreement approved by the Surface Transportation Board, Norfolk Southern acquired 58 percent of Conrail's assets, including roughly 6,000 Conrail route miles, and CSX received 42 percent of Conrail's assets, including about 3,600 route miles.

The buyout was approved by the Surface Transportation Board (successor agency to the Interstate Commerce Commission) and took place on August 22, 1998. Under the control of lawyer-turned-CEO Tim O'Toole, the lines were transferred to two newly formed limited liability companies, to be subsidiaries of Conrail but leased to CSX and Norfolk Southern, respectively New York Central Lines (NYC) and Pennsylvania Lines (PRR). The NYC and PRR reporting marks, which had passed to Conrail, were also transferred to the new companies, and NS also acquired the CR reporting mark. Operations under CSX and NS began on June 1, 1999, bringing Conrail's 23-year existence to an end.

As the names indicated, CSX acquired the former New York Central Railroad main line from New York City and Boston, Massachusetts, to Cleveland, Ohio, and the former Cleveland, Cincinnati, Chicago and St. Louis Railway (NYC Big Four) line to Indianapolis, Indiana (continuing west to East St. Louis, Illinois) on a former Pittsburgh, Cincinnati, Chicago and St. Louis Railroad (PRR Panhandle Route line), while Norfolk Southern got the former Pennsylvania Railroad main line and Cleveland and Pittsburgh Railroad from Jersey City, New Jersey, to Cleveland, and the rest of the former NYC main line west to Chicago, Illinois. Thus the Conrail "X" was neatly split in two, CSX getting one diagonal from Boston to St. Louis and Norfolk Southern the other from New York to Chicago. The two lines cross at a bridge southeast of downtown Cleveland, where the former Cleveland and Pittsburgh Railroad crosses over the NYC's former Cleveland Short Line Railway around the south side of Cleveland.

In three major metropolitan areas – North Jersey, South Jersey/Philadelphia, and Detroit – Conrail Shared Assets Operations continues to serve as a terminal operating company owned by both CSX and NS. The Conrail Shared Assets Operations arrangement was a concession made to federal regulators who were concerned about the lack of competition in certain rail markets and logistical problems associated with the breaking-up of Conrail operations as they existed in densely-populated areas with many local customers. The smaller Conrail operation that exists today serves rail freight customers in these markets on behalf of its two owners. A fourth area, the former Monongahela Railway in southwest Pennsylvania, was originally owned jointly by the Baltimore and Ohio Railroad, Pennsylvania Railroad and Pittsburgh and Lake Erie Railroad. Conrail absorbed the company in 1993, and assigned trackage rights to CSX, the successor to the B&O and P&LE. With the Conrail breakup, those lines are owned by NS, but the CSX trackage rights are still in place.

Locomotives 

Since Conrail was divided between Norfolk Southern Railway and CSX Transportation in 1999, all remaining locomotives have been successively repainted, and many remain in service. CR units had unique features such as "Bright Future" blue paint, flashing ditch lights, and Leslie RS-3L horns. Another key spotting feature is ditchlights mounted under the locomotive's front deck. This is a preference different from Norfolk Southern and CSX, which order locomotives with the lights above the deck. Red marker lights (not class lights, which are multi-color) were also a preference of Conrail. Most locomotives that went to CSX retained their marker lights, while Norfolk Southern quickly removed them. All Conrail locomotives that went to CSX and NS have been either retired or repainted. The last unit to wear "Conrail Blue", NS 8312, was retired in 2014.

Conrail was the only railroad to receive EMD SD80MACs (the Chicago North & Western were originally supposed to receive SD80MACs with marker lights, but when that railroad merged with Union Pacific, the order was rescinded) and were separated evenly between CSX and NS. Conrail had a different paint scheme for these locomotives and also the SD70MAC, with a large white, cone-shaped line on the front, bearing "Conrail Quality" lettering. The SD70MACs weren't fitted with marker lights, as they were ordered after the Conrail breakup was agreed upon, and neither NS or CSX wanted 'their' locomotives to be equipped with markers. Similarly, the standard-cab SD70, Conrail's final order of locomotives, were ordered to NS specifications, and were in Norfolk Southern's preferred numbering series (the 2500's), which they retained after the breakup.

In early 2015, the remaining 12 ex-Conrail SD80MACs owned by CSX, were purchased by Norfolk Southern, and renumbered 7217–7228. All were repainted and had their marker lights removed. Norfolk Southern sold all 29 of its remaining SD80MACs to Canadian Pacific Railway and Progress Rail in 2020. Six units, 7206, 7215, 7218, 7225, 7226 and 7227 were sold to Canadian Pacific Railway as a parts source for the recent EMD SD70ACU rebuilds. The remainder of the NS fleet went to Progress Rail and were scrapped by early 2022.

Signals 

When Conrail was formed, it acquired many different railways, and as typical in the North American rail industry, signaling was not standardized between these railways. This caused problems for Conrail, which had to "qualify" train crews on as many as seven different signaling systems and operating rules. The varying systems included the PRR position light signals, the NYC searchlight signals and tri-light signals, and the EL tri-light and semaphore signals.

Conrail, and other eastern railroads which required multiple operating rules, came up with a standardized rulebook called Northeast Operating Rules Advisory Committee (NORAC). This significantly increased operational flexibly, allowing crews to operate on any territory they were qualified on, instead of additionally needing multiple operating rules qualifications. Additionally, standardized signal rules allowed Conrail to standardize signaling hardware and operation across its system.

In the early years of Conrail, the NYC "small-back" searchlight was adopted as the systemwide standard for new signal installations and replacements. The standard signal was quickly changed to the NYC tri-light. This move was done to decrease maintenance requirements, as searchlight signals need moving parts to switch between colors, unlike tri-lights, which have individual lamps. Many signals from previous railroads were re-used though, as new signaling hardware was expensive, and Conrail faced financial difficulty.

As mentioned above, significant projects took place to reduce trackage, oftentimes removing double-track with automatic block signals in favor of single track with centralized traffic control (CTC). Conrail also installed CTC across much of the former PRR multi-track mainline, which had relied on local towers to operate signals and control track. Conrail spent it entire existence installing tri-light signals (using NORAC rules) across much of its system. Many Conrail-installed signaling locations were removed in the 2010s, as railroads upgraded their signals for Positive Train Control compliance.

Today, most Northeastern railroads associated with former Conrail lines have maintained standardization of all systems as vertical color light signals using NORAC rules. Conrail Shared Assets Operations continues to use the tri-light as its standard signal type. Amtrak uses a colorized version of PRR position light signals called "Position Color Lights".

Preservation 

The Conrail Historical Society, Inc., is a 501(c)(3) non-profit organization based in Shippensburg, Pennsylvania. The society aims to preserve and restore equipment, items pertaining to, and photographs of Conrail specifically and of American railroading in general. As of 2022, the group publishes a quarterly magazine and a calendar, as well as other occasional mailings. Previous conventions have been held in Altoona, Pennsylvania, Philadelphia, Cleveland, and Warren, Ohio. More recent preservation activities include completion of the cosmetic restoration of N7E caboose 21165 and a partnership with the B&O Railroad Museum to restore its ex-Conrail SW7 8905.

The CRHS owns four pieces of on-track equipment: 86-foot boxcar 243880 (currently under development into a stand-alone Conrail museum), cabooses 21165 and 22130, and former Triple Crown RoadRailer TCSZ 463491. A preserved Conrail ex-PRR GP30 is on display at the Railroad Museum of Pennsylvania.

Heritage unit 
To mark its 30th anniversary, Norfolk Southern painted 20 new locomotives with the paint schemes of predecessor railroads. The first, on March 15, 2012, was GE ES44AC #8098 in Conrail blue with the "can opener" logo.

See also 

Defunct railroads of North America
History of rail transportation in the United States
List of companies transferred to Conrail

Notes

References

External links 

Conrail Historical Society
Decision FD-33388 (Surface Transportation Board final decision about the Conrail split)
List and Family Trees of North American Railroads
The Special Court Reporter  available at Hagley Museum and Library constitutes a step-by-step account of the Special Court's proceedings and the playing out of the final stages of railroad reorganization in the Northeast.

 
Corporations chartered by the United States Congress
CSX Transportation
Defunct companies based in Pennsylvania
Defunct Connecticut railroads
Defunct Delaware railroads
Defunct Illinois railroads
Defunct Indiana railroads
Defunct Kentucky railroads
Defunct Maryland railroads
Defunct Massachusetts railroads
Defunct Michigan railroads
Defunct Missouri railroads
Defunct New Jersey railroads
Defunct New York (state) railroads
Defunct Ohio railroads
Defunct Ontario railways
Defunct Pennsylvania railroads
Defunct Rhode Island railroads
Defunct Quebec railways
Defunct Virginia railroads
Defunct Washington, D.C., railroads
Defunct West Virginia railroads
Former Class I railroads in the United States
Government-owned companies of the United States
Norfolk Southern Railway
Predecessors of CSX Transportation
Predecessors of the Norfolk Southern Railway
Rail cooperatives
Railroads in the Chicago metropolitan area
Railway companies established in 1974
Railway companies disestablished in 1999
1976 establishments in the United States
1999 disestablishments in the United States